Rhinella sternosignatus is a species of toad in the family Bufonidae. It is found in Colombia and Venezuela. Its natural habitats are subtropical or tropical moist lowland forests, subtropical or tropical moist montane forests, rivers, freshwater marshes, and intermittent freshwater marshes. It is threatened by habitat loss.

References

sternosignata
Amphibians of Colombia
Amphibians of Venezuela
Amphibians described in 1858
Taxonomy articles created by Polbot